DWKC may refer to the 2 stations both licensed on Metro Manila, Philippines

 DWKC-FM, a radio station (93.9 FM) owned by Radio Mindanao Network
 DWKC-DTV, a digital television station owned by Broadcast Enterprises and Affiliated Media, Channel 31